The Manasquan Friends Meetinghouse and Burying Ground, also known as the Manasquan Monthly Meeting of the Religious Society of Friends, is a historic meetinghouse and cemetery on Route 35 at the Manasquan Circle in Wall Township in Monmouth County, New Jersey, United States. Meetinghouses are generally used for "meetings for worship" and "meetings for business". Built in 1884, it was added to the National Register of Historic Places on July 22, 1992, for its significance in religion.

See also
National Register of Historic Places listings in Monmouth County, New Jersey

References

External links
 

Wall Township, New Jersey
Churches on the National Register of Historic Places in New Jersey
Churches in Monmouth County, New Jersey
Cemeteries in Monmouth County, New Jersey
National Register of Historic Places in Monmouth County, New Jersey
Churches completed in 1884
New Jersey Register of Historic Places